Long Live the King may refer to:

"The king is dead, long live the king!", a traditional proclamation

Music
Long Live the King (album), by Narnia, 1999
Long Live the King (EP), by The Decemberists, 2011
"Long Live the King", a song by Sabaton from Carolus Rex
"Long Live the King", a song by Twilight Force from the 2019 album Dawn of the Dragonstar

Other uses
Long Live the King (1923 film), an American silent film starring Jackie Coogan
Long Live the King (2019 film), a South Korean film directed by Kang Yoon-sung
"Long Live the King" (Hercules: The Legendary Journeys), a television episode
Long Live the King!, a 1917 novel by Mary Roberts Rinehart

See also
Long Live The Kings, an album by Kottonmouth Kings
Long Live the Queen (disambiguation)